Diabetes, Obesity and Metabolism is a monthly peer-reviewed medical journal established in 1999 covering research on diabetes, obesity, and metabolism. According to the Journal Citation Reports, the journal had a 2020 impact factor of 6.577, ranking 21st of 146 in the area of Endocrinology/Metabolism.

References

External links 
 

Endocrinology journals
Monthly journals
Wiley-Blackwell academic journals
English-language journals
Publications established in 1999